Casimir Maistre (24 September 1867, in Villeneuvette (Hérault) – 20 September 1957, in Montpellier) was a French explorer and geographer.

In 1889-91 with Georges Foucart (1865–1943), he participated in the "Catat mission" in Madagascar, an exploratory investigation of the island's resources.

In early 1892 he was sent by the Comité de l'Afrique française to the French Congo in order to reinforce an exploratory mission led by Jean Dybowski (1856–1928). At Brazzaville he met with Dybowski, who was ill and on his way back to France. On 29 June Maistre and a handful of Europeans, departed from their position on the Kémo (a tributary of the Ubanghi)   in order to explore largely unfamiliar regions of the continent's interior. On the expedition he would journey over 5000 kilometers, engaging in numerous treaties with African chieftains as a means to consolidate French influence in the region.

In the interior he recognized that the Chari and Logone Rivers were navigable year-round, as well as primary access routes to/from the Lake Chad area. After his return to France, he was honored by the Société de Géographie in 1894 for his exploratory efforts. As a result of the mission, he published two books:
 À travers l'Afrique centrale, du Congo au Niger (1892–1893), (1893)
 La région du Bahr Sara, (1902).

After his return from Africa he settled in Villeneuvette, where he worked as a manager in a family-owned factory.

References 
 Parts of this article are based on a translation of an equivalent article at the French Wikipedia, namely: Olivier Saint-Jouan. Family History Delpon, Delpon Vaux, Delpon of Vissec, and its progeny. Paris. In 2008. (Departmental Archives de l'Hérault. Ref: 11F357).

External links 
 Brazza.culture
 Persee.fr (biography in French)

1867 births
1957 deaths
Explorers of Africa
French explorers
French geographers
Scientists from Montpellier